Lambert of Maastricht, commonly referred to as Saint Lambert (Middle Dutch: Sint-Lambrecht; ;  636 – c. 705 AD) was the bishop of Maastricht-Liège (Tongeren) from about 670 until his death. Lambert denounced Pepin's liaison with his mistress Alpaida, the mother of Charles Martel. The bishop was murdered during the political turmoil that developed when various families fought for influence as the Merovingian dynasty gave way to the Carolingians. He is considered a martyr for his defence of marriage. His feast day is September 17.

Life
Very little is known about the life of Lambert. According to the 14th-century chronicle-writer Jean d'Outremeuse he was the son of Apre, lord of Loon, and his wife Herisplindis, both from noble families of Maastricht. The child was baptized by his godfather, the local bishop Remaclus, and educated by Landoald, archpriest of the city and head of the noble abbey school in Wintershoven. Lambert was related to the seneschal Hugobert, the father of Plectrude, who was Pepin of Herstal's lawful wife. He was thus an in-law of hereditary mayors of the palace who controlled the Merovingian kings of Austrasia.

Lambert appears to have frequented the Merovingian court of King Childeric II, and was a protégé of his uncle, Theodard, who succeeded Remaclus as bishop of Maastricht. He is described by early biographers as “a prudent young man of pleasing looks, courteous and well-behaved in his speech and manners, well-built, strong, a good fighter, clear-headed, affectionate, pure and humble, and fond of reading.” When Theodard was murdered  soon after 669, the councillors of Childeric made Lambert bishop of Maastricht.   

After Childeric himself was murdered in 675, the faction of Ebroin, majordomo of Neustria and the power behind that throne, expelled him from his see, in favor of their candidate, Faramundus. Lambert spent seven years in exile at the recently founded Abbey of Stavelot (674–681). With a change in the turbulent political fortunes of the time, Pepin of Herstal became mayor of the palace and Lambert was allowed to return to his see. 

In company with Willibrord, who had come from England in 691, Lambert preached the gospel in the lower stretches of the Meuse, in the area to the north.  In conjunction with Landrada he founded a convent at Munsterblizen.   Lambert was also the spiritual director of the young noble Hubertus, eldest son of Bertrand, Duke of Aquitaine. Hubertus would later succeed Lambert as bishop of Maastricht.

Lambert seems to have succumbed to the political turmoil that developed when various clans fought for influence as the Merovingian dynasty gave way to the Carolingians. Historian Jean-Louis Kupper says that the bishop was the victim of a private struggle between two clans seeking to control the Tongres-Maastricht see. Lambert is said to have denounced Pepin's adulterous liaison with Alpaida, who was to become the mother of Charles Martel. This aroused the enmity of either Pepin, Alpaida, or both. The bishop was murdered at Liège by the troops of Dodon, Pepin's domesticus (manager of state domains), father or brother of Alpaida. The year of his death is variously given for some time between 705 and 709.  Lambert came to be viewed as a martyr for his defence of marital fidelity. Lambert's two nephews, Peter and Audolet, were also killed defending their uncle. They too, were viewed as saints. Many historians however question the accuracy of the relationship between Alpaida and Dodon, due to that claim appearing much later. 

Although Lambert was buried at Maastricht, his successor as bishop, Hubertus, translated his relics to Liège, to which the see of Maastricht was eventually moved. To enshrine Lambert's relics, Hubertus, built a basilica near Lambert's residence which became the true nucleus of the city. The shrine became St. Lambert's Cathedral, destroyed in 1794. Its site is the modern Place Saint-Lambert. Lambert's tomb is now located in the present Liège Cathedral. The Cathedral of Our Lady and St. Lambert in Liège was built in his honor.

Patronage
Lambert is the patron of the city of Liège. 

His feast day in the Roman Catholic Church calendar is 17 September. The Lambertusfest in Münster has long been a folk holiday, celebrated for two weeks culminating on the eve of 17 September.  Children build "Lambertus pyramids" of branches, decorated with lanterns and lamps around which they dance and sing traditional songs (known as Lambertussingen or Käskenspiel).

A few churches in Germany and Belgium are dedicated to Saint Lambert.

References

External links

Das Ökumenisches Heiligenlexikon: Lambert (Lantpert) von Maastricht (von Lüttich) 

636 births
705 deaths
7th-century Frankish nobility
8th-century Frankish saints
Belgian Roman Catholic saints
Dutch Roman Catholic saints
8th-century Frankish bishops
People from Maastricht
Bishops of Liège